Oak Harbor is a city located on Whidbey Island in Island County, Washington, United States. The population was 22,075 at the 2010 census. Oak Harbor was incorporated on May 14, 1915.

History

The Lower Skagit people have inhabited Oak Harbor and the nearby Crescent Harbor since time immemorial. There were several villages in the vicinity, and the modern settlement of Oak Harbor was built over one such village.  

In the early 1850s, two settlers staked claims where the city now stands—Zakarias Toftezen, a shoemaker from Norway; C.W. Sumner from New England. Irish and Dutch immigrants also arrived and settled in the area. Oak Harbor was named for the area's Garry Oak trees and was incorporated in 1915 with a population of 401. Houses and businesses sprouted up along the shores of Oak Harbor as the pioneers relied entirely on water transportation until the 1900s. For the next 30 years, steamers and freighters carried passengers and freight from the Island to the mainland and back as well as Fidalgo Island to the north. The city grew following the completion of Deception Pass Bridge on July 31, 1935, and Naval Air Station Whidbey Island on September 21, 1942. The bridge, which linked Whidbey Island to Fidalgo Island and the mainland, was a Public Works Administration project built by the Civilian Conservation Corps.

Geography
Access to the island by land is only available by driving through Deception Pass. Other ways to travel to Whidbey Island include flying or utilizing a ferry service. The Mukilteo–Clinton ferry provides service connecting the southern end of Whidbey Island and just north of Seattle, WA.

Surveys of shorelines throughout the Puget Sound region have indicated that 58% are "unstable".  Average retreat rates range from one to eight centimeters per year and shores in the Puget Sound area, composed of unconsolidated sediment, erode 10 to 100 times faster than rocky shoreline.

Climate
Oak Harbor has a pleasant Mediterranean climate (Köppen Csb) characterized by warm dry summers and cold, though not severe, and damp winters. The Olympic rain shadow means that the region is much drier than most of the Pacific Northwest west of the Cascades.

Demographics

2010 census
As of the census of 2010, there were 22,075 people, 8,677 households, and 5,789 families living in the city. The racial makeup of the city was 72.6% White, 4.9% African American, 0.9% Native American, 10.2% Asian, 1.0% Pacific Islander, 2.7% from other races, and 7.8% from two or more races. Hispanic or Latino of any race were 9.3% of the population.

There were 8,677 households, of which 38.6% had children under the age of 18 living with them, 51.7% were married couples living together, 11.4% had a female householder with no husband present, 3.5% had a male householder with no wife present, and 33.3% were non-families. 26.9% of all households were made up of individuals, and 8.5% had someone living alone who was 65 years of age or older. The average household size was 2.53 and the average family size was 3.09.

The median age in the city was 29 years. 28.3% of residents were under the age of 18; 12.3% were between the ages of 18 and 24; 31.9% were from 25 to 44; 17% were from 45 to 64; and 10.3% were 65 years of age or older. The gender makeup of the city was 49.2% male and 50.8% female.

2000 census
As of the census of 2000, there were 19,795 people, 7,333 households, and 5,265 families living in the city. The population density was 2,175.0 people per square mile (839.9/km2). There were 7,772 housing units at an average density of 854.0 per square mile (329.8/km2). The racial makeup of the city was 74.9% White, 5.5% African American, 9.6% Asian, 1.2% Native American, 0.8% Pacific Islander, 2.4% from other races, and 5.6% from two or more races. Hispanic or Latino of any race were 6.6% of the population.

There were 7,333 households, out of which 43.4% had children under the age of 18 living with them, 59.0% were married couples living together, 9.7% had a female householder with no husband present, and 28.2% were non-families. Also, 22.2% of all households comprised individuals and 7.2% had someone living alone who was 65 years of age or older. The average household size was 2.68 and the average family size was 3.18.

In the city, the population was spread out, with 31.6% under the age of 18, 11.6% from 18 to 24, 34.4% from 25 to 44, 13.4% from 45 to 64, and 9.0% who were 65 years of age or older. The median age was 28 years. For every 100 females, there were 98.7 males. For every 100 females age 18 and over, there were 95.2 males.

The median income for a household in the city was $36,641, and the median income for a family was $41,579. Males had a median income of $29,498 versus $21,633 for females. The per capita income for the city was $16,830. About 8.1% of families and 9.3% of the population were below the poverty line, including 11.2% of those under age 18 and 5.4% of those age 65 or over.

Government
As of the 2020 election, Oak Harbor has gotten a majority Republican vote (47.53%), followed by Democratic (46.81%) and the Third Parties (5.66%).

Notable people
Shayla Beesley – actress
Lamont Brightful – player in the NFL and Canadian Football League
Michael Harring – filmmaker
Marti Malloy – Olympic Judo medalist
Patricia McPherson – actress
Jerod Turner – golfer
Robert Lee Yates - serial killer

References

External links
 City of Oak Harbor official website
 Oak Harbor Tourism and Visitor Service
 Oak Harbor Chamber of Commerce 
 Oak Harbor Events and Activities

 
Cities in Washington (state)
Cities in Island County, Washington
Micropolitan areas of Washington (state)